Heby AIF is a Swedish football club located in Heby in Uppsala County.

Background
Heby Allmänna Idrottsförening is a sports club from Heby that was formed on 15 May 1912.

Since their foundation Heby AIF has participated mainly in the middle divisions of the Swedish football league system. The club currently plays in Division 3 Södra Norrland which is the fifth tier of Swedish football. They play their home matches at the Tegelvallen in Heby.

Heby AIF are affiliated to Upplands Fotbollförbund. In 2009, the club's Board decided to start a new club, known as Heby AIF FF, to play in the lower divisions.

Their nearest rivals are Sala FF.

Recent history
In recent seasons Heby AIF have competed in the following divisions:

2011 – Division III, Södra Norrland
2010 – Division III, Norra Svealand
2009 – Division III, Norra Svealand
2008 – Division II, Norra Svealand
2007 – Division II, Norra Svealand
2006 – Division III, Södra Norrland
2005 – Division IV, Uppland
2004 – Division III, Norra Svealand
2003 – Division III, Norra Svealand
2002 – Division III, Norra Svealand
2001 – Division III, Norra Svealand
2000 – Division III, Norra Svealand
1999 – Division III, Norra Svealand
1998 – Division III, Norra Svealand
1997 – Division III, Norra Svealand
1996 – Division III, Norra Svealand
1995 – Division III, Norra Svealand
1994 – Division II, Västra Svealand
1993 – Division III, Södra Norrland

Attendances

In recent seasons, Heby AIF have had the following average attendances:

Footnotes

External links
 Heby AIF – Official website
 Heby AIF on Facebook
 HAIF Bloggen

Football clubs in Uppsala County
Association football clubs established in 1912
1912 establishments in Sweden